Nikolov (Macedonian and Bulgarian: Николов), feminine Nikolova, is a Macedonian and Bulgarian patronymic and family name, derived from the personal name Nikola and may refer to:

Bulgarian and Macedonian surname
 Alexander Nikolov (boxer) (born 1940), a boxer from Bulgaria
 Andon Nikolov (born 1951), a Bulgarian weightlifter
 Asen Nikolov (nicknamed Bebeto (Бебето); (born 1976, Plovdiv), a Bulgarian footballer
 Atanas Nikolov ((born 1977), a Bulgarian footballer
 Balázs Nikolov, a Hungarian footballer of Bulgarian descent
 Boban Nikolov, a Macedonian footballer
 Boris Nikolov (disambiguation page)
 Dimitar Blagoev Nikolov (1856–1924), a Bulgarian political leader
 Elka Nikolova, a New York-based Bulgarian film director
 Georgi Nikolov ((born 1983, Sofia), a Bulgarian footballer
 Georgi (Gjorče) Petrov Nikolov (1864/5 - 1921), one of the leaders of the Macedonian-Adrianople revolutionary movement
 Hristo Nikolov-Choko (born 1939, Varna), a Bulgarian football player
 Ilia Nikolov ((born 1986), a Bulgarian footballer
 Iliana Nikolova, a Bulgarian sprint canoer who competed in the late 1970s
 Ivan Vedar, born Danail Nikolov, often referred to as the founder of freemasonry in Bulgaria
 Kiril Nikolov ("Disl", born 1982), Bulgarian orienteer
 Kiril Nikolov ((born 1976), a Bulgarian footballer
 Lyudmil Nikolov ((born 1984), a Bulgarian football player
 Nikola Koev Nikolov (known as "Mamin Kolyu"; 1880–1961), a Bulgarian revolutionary of the Internal Macedonian-Adrianopolitan Revolutionary Organization
 Marija Nikolova, a Macedonian musician
 Mila Nikolova (1962–2018), Bulgarian mathematician
 Nikolay Nikolov (disambiguation page)
Nikolay Nikolov (athlete) (born 1964), Bulgarian pole vaulter
Nikolay Nikolov (footballer, born 1981), Bulgarian footballer
Nikolay Nikolov (footballer, born 1985), Bulgarian footballer
 Oka Nikolov (born 1974, Erbach im Odenwald), a Macedonian-German football goalkeeper
 Olivera Nikolova (born 1936), a distinguished Macedonian author
 Plamen Nikolov; several Bulgarian footballers
 Plamen Nikolov (footballer born 1957)
 Plamen Nikolov (footballer born 1961)
 Plamen Nikolov (footballer born 1985)
 Rumen Nikolov, a Bulgarian sprint canoer who competed in the mid-1990s
 Stoyanka Savova Nikolova, stage name: "Elena Nicolai" (1905–1993), a Bulgarian mezzo-soprano
 Tane Nikolov (1873-1947), a Bulgarian revolutionary
 Vladimir Nikolov (volleyball), a Bulgarian volleyball player

Patronymic
 Blaga Nikolova Dimitrova (1922–2003), a Bulgarian poet
 Dimitar Nikolov Yakimov (born August 12, 1941), Bulgarian footballer
 Elena Nikolova Yoncheva, a Bulgarian freelance journalist
 Georgi Nikolov Glouchkov (. (born January 10, 1960, in Tryavna), a Bulgarian basketball player
 Georgi "Goce (Gotse)" Nikolov Delchev (Delčev) (: 1872-1903), an important revolutionary figure in then Ottoman ruled Macedonia and Thrace
 Hadzhi Dimitar Nikolov Asenov (1840–1868), one of the most prominent Bulgarian voivods and revolutionaries working for the Liberation of Bulgaria from Ottoman rule
 Hristo Nikolov Lukov (1887–1943), a Bulgarian general
 Hristo (Christo) Nikolov Makedonski (1835–1916), a Bulgarian hajduk voivode and revolutionary from Macedonia.
 Ivan Nikolov (Nicolá) Stranski (1897–1979), a Bulgarian physical chemist
 Jordan Nikolov Orce (1916, Skopje - 1942), a communist and partisan from Macedonia
 Kliment Turnovski (born Vasil Nikolov Drumev; c. 1841 - 1901), a leading Bulgarian clergyman and politician
 Nikola Nikolov Stanchev (. September 11, 1930 – July 12, 2009), a Bulgarian freestyle wrestler
 Petar Nikolov Petrov (born 17 February 1955, Svishtov, Veliko Tarnovo), a Bulgarian sprinter
 Stefan Nikolov Stambolov (1854–1895), a Bulgarian statesman
 Stoyan Nikolov Mihaylovski (1856–1927), a Bulgarian writer
 Vasil Nikolov Zlatarski, a Bulgarian historian-medievist, archaeologist, and epigraphist
 Vladimir Nikolov Damgov (1947–2006), a Bulgarian physicist, mathematician
 Volen Nikolov Siderov (. (born 19 April 1956), a controversial Bulgarian politician

Other
 12386 Nikolova (1994 UK5), a Main-belt Asteroid (d. 1994)

See also 
 Nikolovski
 Nikola

Bulgarian-language surnames
Macedonian-language surnames
Patronymic surnames
Surnames from given names